= Ken Sigaty =

Canadian football player

Profile
- Position: Fullback

Personal information
- Born: 1944 or 1945 (age 81–82); Canada
- Listed height: 6 ft 0 in (1.83 m)
- Listed weight: 200 lb (91 kg)

Career history
- 1964–1966: Edmonton Eskimos

Ken Sigaty (born 1944 or 1945) is a Canadian football player who played for the Edmonton Eskimos. He previously played football for the Edmonton Huskies.
